Mary Rubin Schepisi (born March 6, 1949) is an American artist currently working in Melbourne, Australia, and New York City.  She is married to the film director Fred Schepisi.

Background 

Schepisi was born Mary Rubin into a Jewish family in New York City.  Her father, the son of Polish immigrants, operated a company supplying industrial uniforms.  Her mother migrated to the United States from England.  Always supportive of Schepisi's interest in the arts, her parents enrolled her in the Art Students League of New York at the age of 10, where she came to study with many leading figures in the formative art movements of the 1960s, including the painters Jean Liberte and Milton Glasier.  She attended Birch Wathen School on the Upper East Side and Boston University's College of Fine Arts.  Schepisi spent her early career in the fashion and modeling industries.  She has one sister, Leslie Slatkin, a nephew, William Slatkin, one son, Nicholas Schepisi, who currently works in film in New York, and six step-children.

Work 
Schepisi's figurative-based works involve drawing, painting, collage, needlework and a range of mixed media applications. When signing her smaller works Schepisi on occasion uses the lower-case monogram "mrs".  Her art practice is notable for the high level of engagement she pursues with her subject matter.  From the political to the personal, covering topics from perestroika to domestic violence, Schepisi often develops a close working partnership with her subjects as each body of work takes shape.

Schepisi's early work comprised small-scale pieces undertaken in her travels to film locations with her director-husband Fred Schepisi.  One notable exhibition from these years was Glasnost/Perestroika (1990) shown in different configurations in London, Los Angeles and Melbourne, which was executed in 1989 during the shooting of The Russia House in Moscow, the first American production granted permission to film in the Soviet Union.   With access to many leading figures in Russian film circles, including Raisa Fomina, Masha Chugunova (assistant to Andrei Tarkovsky), the producer Leonid Vereschagin and the famed director Elem Klimov, the artist employed painting and collage—clipping reports in the morning newspaper and gathering ephemera from her daily travels in Moscow—to chronicle the rapidly changing cultural landscape under Mikhail Gorbachev's policy of perestroika.

Schepisi's most recent body of work, Beauty Interrupted (2011) involves photographs of models in New York, Paris and Milan fashion shows similarly over-painted with contemporary and topical imagery including burkhas and burkinis (Islam-approved swimwear).

Her more personal work is both intimate and confronting, delving into issues of domestic violence, mental illness and sexual assault, in some cases combining text with portraiture.  In Speculations (2004), Schepisi asked a large number of women to write often highly personal biographical essays before painting their portraits.   The essays and paintings were then hung unmatched, leaving it to the viewer to connect each woman's life story to her portrait.

In recent years Schepisi has turned to needlework to address both the personal and political from her strongly feminist perspective.   The subject matter for these pieces varies widely, from images of handguns and household cleaning products to indigenous Australian iconography and text-based invectives.  A current work-in-progress entails a body of needlepoint revealing an exchange of imagined love letters sent between her Polish grandmother and the fictive Leipzig artist Johann Dieter Wassmann (1841–1898).   Of this use of text Schepisi writes:

Schepisi has been an active supporter of arts philanthropy, in 2009 organizing an art auction that raised $84,000 for the Juvenile Diabetes Research Foundation.  She and her husband own a winery on Victoria's Mornington Peninsula, where they live part of the year.

Exhibitions

Solo exhibitions 
2018: Out of the Heat, In from the Cold, Artvisory Gallery, Melbourne
2011: Beauty Interrupted, L'Oreal Melbourne Fashion Festival
2011: It's Up To You, Mossgreen Gallery, Melbourne
2009: Guns, Birds & Words, Bowman/Bloom, New York
2009: Guns, Birds & Words, Chapman & Bailey, Melbourne
2007: Inferences ... a summer diary, Bowman/Bloom, New York
2004: The Collection, Span Galleries, Melbourne
2004: Speculations, Span Galleries, Melbourne
2002: Bodies of Evidence, Span Galleries, Melbourne
2002: Mary's Little Gems, 69 Smith Street, Melbourne
2000: Postcard Show, Royal College of Art, London
1998: Toys for Joy, Royal Children's Hospital, Melbourne
1997: George Gallery, Melbourne
1994: The Sofa Series, William Mora Gallery, Melbourne
1990: Glasnost/Perestroika, Jo Wilder Gallery, Los Angeles
1990: Glasnost/Perestroika, William Mora Gallery, Melbourne
1990: Glasnost/Perestroika, San Lorenzo, London
1988: Evil Angels, Peter Grant Fine Art, Melbourne

Group exhibitions 
2010: Conflict/Interest, Second Street Gallery, Charlottesville, Virginia
2008: The Beast In Me, Bowman/Bloom, New York
2001: Art by Gum, School of Botany Foundation, University of Melbourne
2000: Secret, Royal College of Art Exhibition, London
1999: George Galley, Melbourne
1998: Exchanging Places, George Gallery in Residence, Ray Hughes Gallery, Sydney
1995: Sofa Series, at the River, Southgate, Melbourne
1991: Mr. Baseball, Diane Farris Gallery, Vancouver

External links 
 Mary Schepisi website

References 

American contemporary artists
1949 births
Living people
Postmodern artists
Feminist artists
Artists from New York City
Art Students League of New York alumni
American people of Polish-Jewish descent
American people of English descent
Boston University College of Fine Arts alumni
20th-century American artists
20th-century American women artists
21st-century American women artists
Birch Wathen Lenox School alumni